Bethel is an unincorporated community in Franklin Township, Wayne County, in the U.S. state of Indiana. Bethel is home of Indianas highest natural point, Hoosier Hill.

History
Bethel was laid out in 1850. A post office was established at Bethel in 1850, and remained in operation until it was discontinued in 1915.

Geography

The visitation picnic area was created in 2005.

In popular culture

Ghost Nation TV Series
"Phantom Fury" (Season 2, episode 14) was filmed at a residents home located on Bethel road in Bethel, Indiana. Ghost Nation is a paranormal investigation TV series created by former investigators from Ghost Hunters. The episode was filmed in August of 2020 and aired on January 16, 2021.

John Dillinger
Famous American gangster from the 1930s, John Dillinger, has connections to Bethel, IN. Dillinger had created somewhat of a relationship with a woman named Mary Longnecker. She is the woman found on the picture that was in Dillingers watch after he was shot. While he was in prison, Longnecker had gotten involved with a Bethel resident named "Claude Constable". During this time, Dillinger's gang escaped him from prison and he either had swept through town, or had intentions to after hearing of the events.

References

Unincorporated communities in Wayne County, Indiana
Unincorporated communities in Indiana